Sybaris or Lamia of Mount Cirphis, Greece, was a legendary cave-dwelling giant beast that devoured both livestock and humans. It was hurled from an overhanging rock and killed by the hero Eurybatus. Though precise physical description is given in the primary source, it has been hypothesized by modern commentators that she must have been a dragon or an anguiped.

Mythology 
According to the Greek mythology myth, recorded by Antoninus Liberalis, Sybaris or Lamia was a giant beast that dwelled on Mount Cirphis and terrorized the countryside of Krisa, ancient name of Delphi, devouring livestock and people.

The people of the region asked the Oracle of Delphi how to end the depredations. The god Apollo answered that a young man should be offered to the beast to achieve peace from it. The young and handsome Alkyoneus, son of Diomos and Meganeira, was selected to be the victim, but the hero Eurybatus (Eurybarus), son of Euphemos and a descendant of the river god Axios, was overcome with love for Alkyoneus and became determined to save him. He took his place as the victim and hurled the dragon from the mountainside, striking it against the rocks where a fountain sprung up.

This spring was later named "Sybaris" by the locals, and was the namesake of the city of Sybaris (in what is now Italy).

Interpretations 
Although the primary text only refers to the Lamia-Sybaris as a giant beast, and gives no particulars on her physical description regarding any serpentine features, modern commentators have given circumstantial evidence suggesting she was a dragoness, due to paralleling stories of the male dragon, such as the Python that also despoiled the Delphi region.

Antoninus Liberalis gave "Lamia" as an alternate name for the creature, perhaps conflating Sybaris with the better known Lamia.

Notes

References 
 Antoninus Liberalis, The Metamorphoses of Antoninus Liberalis translated by Francis Celoria (Routledge 1992). Online version at the Topos Text Project.

 Antoninus Liberalis, Metamorphoses, 8
  
 

Greek dragons
Greek legendary creatures
Female legendary creatures
Metamorphoses into bodies of water in Greek mythology